Bender: The Beginning, also known as Ostap Bender. The Beginning is a 2021 Russian action adventure comedy film directed by Igor Zaytsev, a prequel to The Twelve Chairs from the production company Sreda.
It stars Sergey Bezrukov as Ibrahim Bender, and Aram Vardevanyan in the role was dedicated to Ostap Bender-Zadunaisky.

It is scheduled to be theatrically released on 24 June 2021.

Plot 
The film is set in 1919. A young idealist named Osip ran into a Turkish swindler, Ibrahim Bender, who, like Osip, hunts for a royal relic. Osip learns from Ibrahim flattery, deception, blackmail and brute force, falls in love with a fatal beautiful foreigner and becomes the legendary Ostap Bender.

Cast 
 Sergey Bezrukov as Ibrahim Suleiman Berta-Maria Bender-Bey
 Aram Vardevanyan as Osip "Osya" Zadunaisky (Ostap Bender-Zadunaisky)
 Nikita Kologrivyy as Mishka Yaponchik
 Taisiya Vilkova as Eva Machulskaya, a swindler 
 Natalya Bochkareva as Madame Tsits
 Georgy Shtil as Fuks
 Aleksandr Tsekalo as Mark Sokolovich 
 Yuliya Rutberg as Madame Sokolovich
 Yuliya Makarova as Sofi Sokolovich
 Olga Sutulova as Osip's mother
 Garik Kharlamov as Valiadis, host cabaret 
 Artyom Tkachenko as Staff captain Ametistov, military commandant of Solnechnomorsk 
 Aleksandr Ilin as Mendel Vinnitsky, Mishka's father 
 Yuri Kolokolnikov as Grigory Kotovsky
 Pavel Derevyanko as Nestor Makhno
 Andrey Levin as Leon Trotsky
 Richard Lappers as Mr. Armand Hammer

Production 
The film was shot by the Sreda company, owned by Aleksandr Tsekalo, and the television channel Russia-1. The film was directed by Igor Zaytsev. 
Bender: The Beginning is the first part of the series, followed by the films Bender: Gold of the Empire and Bender: The Final Hustle.
It is assumed that later on from these pictures a single series about Ostap Bender will be created.

See also
 Bender: Gold of the Empire – Part 2 (2021 film)
 Bender: The Final Hustle – Part 3 (2021 film)

References

External links 
 

2021 films
2020s Russian-language films
2021 action adventure films
2021 action comedy films
2020s adventure comedy films
Russian action adventure films
Russian action comedy films
Russian adventure comedy films
Films about the Russian Empire
Films based on television series
Russian prequel films